Firewalker may refer to:

A practitioner of firewalking
Firewalker (film), a 1986 film
"Firewalker" (The X-Files), an episode from season 2 of The X-Files
Mass Effect 2: Firewalker, a downloadable content pack for the video game Mass Effect 2